The  is the principal railway line on the island of Shikoku in Japan, connecting the major cities of Shikoku, and via the Honshi-Bisan Line, with Honshu. It is operated by the Shikoku Railway Company (JR Shikoku), and is aligned approximately parallel with the Inland Sea coast, connecting the prefectural capitals of Takamatsu (Kagawa Prefecture) and Matsuyama (Ehime Prefecture) and continuing on to Uwajima.

The line consists of two alignments between Mukaibara and Iyo-Ōzu. The original main line follows the coast via Iyo-Nagahama, while the direct line, opened in 1986 as a bypass of the lengthy coastal route, goes through the mountains via Uchiko, part of which is known as the Uchiko Line (as it was originally part of the Uchiko branch), and all limited express trains now use this route.

Until 1988 the Yosan Line, along with the Dosan Line, connected with the Rail Ferry (from Uno) at Takamatsu Station. Direct services from Okayama now operate with the completion of the Great Seto Bridge system, over which the Honshi-Bisan Line travels.

Basic data
Operators, distances:
Shikoku Railway Company (JR Shikoku) (Services and tracks)
Takamatsu — Uwajima: 
Mukaibara — Uchiko: 
Niiya — Iyo-Ōzu: 
Japan Freight Railway Company (JR Freight) (Services)
Takamatsu – Iyo-Yokota: 
Double-tracked section: Takamatsu – Tadotsu
Railway signalling: Centralized Traffic Control (CTC)
Maximum speed:
Takamatsu – Matsuyama: 
Matsuyama – Uchiko, Iyo-Iwaki – Unomachi: 
Other sections:

Services
As the most important trunk line of Shikoku, the line has many limited express services. These include:
 Ishizuchi
 Midnight Express Takamatsu
 Shiokaze
 Uwakai
 Shimanto
 Nanpū
 Uzushio
 Sunrise Seto
 Midnight Express Matsuyama

There are two rapid services. The Sunport Nanpū Relay-Gō rapid service connects Takamatsu and Iyo-Saijō. The Marine Liner rapid service connects Takamatsu with Okayama via the Seto-Ōhashi Line.

Local service typically serves one of four sections of the Yosan Line, generally divided at Kan'onji, Iyo-Saijō, and Matsuyama.

History
The first segment of the line, from Tadotsu to Marugame, was constructed by the Sanuki Railway Co. and commenced operation in 1889. The Marugame - Takamatsu section opened in 1897, and in the company was nationalised in 1906.

The line was extended west from Tadotsu in sections commencing in 1913, reaching Matsuyama in 1927. Further west, a private 762mm (2'6") gauge line was opened from Iyo Nagahama - Iyo Ozu, with the line being privatised in 1933. The line from Matsuyama was extended in sections to Iyo Nagahama between 1927–35, with the former private line being regauged to 1067mm (3'6") gauge in 1935. Further western extensions opened 1936-45, when Uwajima (and the Yodo Line) was connected to the Yosan line.

On August 1, 1933, the entire line was renamed the Yosan Main Line. In 1987, with the privatization of the Japanese National Railways, the line became simply the Yosan Line.

The Takamatsu - Tadotsu section was duplicated 1965-70, and CTC signalling commissioned in 1985 between Takamatsu - Matsuyama. The 'direct line' between Mukaibara - Iyo Ozu (including the 6,012m Inuyose tunnel) opened in 1986, incorporating part of the former Uchicko branch and shortening the route by 6.3 km.

The Takamatsu - Tadotsu section was electrified in 1987, enabling direct Takamatsu - Okayama services when the Seto Ohashi Bridge system opened the following year.

The Iyo Hojo - Matsumoto - Iyoshi section was electrified in 1990, with the Tadotsu - Imabari section being energised in 1992, and the Imabari - Iyo Hojo section in 1993, enabling direct Matsuyama - Okayama electric services to be introduced.

Following the Tohoku major earthquake, JR Shikoku, JR East, and JR Freight announced that JR Shikoku's popular Ampanman Torokko Train would tour areas devastated by the earthquake and tsunami.

Former connecting lines
Sakaide station - 
 The Kotohira Express Railway Co. operated a 16 km line to Kotohira on the Dosan Line 1930-44, with the line formally closing in 1954.
 The Kotohira Sangu Railway Co. operated a 27 km line to Tadotsu 1922/28 - 63, with a 7 km branch to Kotohira operated 1923-63.

Niihama Station - The Sumitomo Copper Co. operated a 15 km 762 mm gauge line to Hinokiogawa (known as the 'bottom line') opened in 1893 which included a 3 km duplicated section. It carried passengers 1929-55, and was electrified at 600 V DC in 1950. The mine closed in 1973 and the railway 4 years later. An isolated 5.5 km 762 mm line, situated at 80 0m elevation (known as the 'top line') and connected to the bottom line by a cableway operated 1893–1911.

Station list
 Local trains stop at every station.
 For information on the Shiokaze, Ishizuchi, Uwakai and other limited express services, please see their respective articles.

Legend
 Station: "●": all trains stop; "▲": some trains stop; "｜": all trains pass
 Track: "∥": double-track section; "◇": single-track section (passing allowed); "｜": single-track section (no passing); "v" & "^": transition to/from double-track section

Takamatsu – Iyo-Saijō 
 Sunport: Includes Sunport Nanpū Relay-Gō rapid service; non-rapid Nanpū Relay-Gō trains stop at every station.

Iyo-Saijō – Iyo-Nagahama – Uwajima 
 All stations located in Ehime Prefecture.

Mukaibara – Uchiko – Iyo-Ōzu 
 Station list includes the Uchiko Line section between Uchiko and Niiya.
 All stations located in Ehime Prefecture.

See also
List of railway lines in Japan

References
This article incorporates material from the corresponding article in the Japanese Wikipedia

External links 

  

 
Lines of Shikoku Railway Company
1067 mm gauge railways in Japan
Railway lines opened in 1889